Aidos yamouna is a moth of the Aididae family found in Ecuador and Colombia.

References

Moths described in 1891
Zygaenoidea